Rudniki  is a village in the administrative district of Gmina Susz, within Iława County, Warmian-Masurian Voivodeship, in northern Poland.

The village has a population of 160.

References

Rudniki